Dancing Vienna (German: Das tanzende Wien) is a 1927 German silent comedy film directed by Frederic Zelnik and starring Lya Mara, Ben Lyon and Alfred Abel. The film's art direction was by Andrej Andrejew, Ferdinand Bellan and Erich Kettelhut. It was shot at the Staaken Studios in Berlin and on location in Vienna. It was one of several prototypes of the Heimatfilm made by Zelnik in the 1920s. The film was intended as a loose sequel to Zelnik's The Blue Danube (1926).

Cast
Lya Mara as Komtesse Frizzi Zirsky 
Ben Lyon as Jonny Conzaga 
Alfred Abel as Dichter 
Eugen Burg as Kaiser Franz Josef
Albert Paulig as Kaiser's adjutant 
Julius Falkenstein as Count Zirsky 
Gustav Charle as Konstantin, Zirsky's servant
Arthur Kraußneck as Wirt vom 'Eisvogel' 
Kurt Gerron as Ein Feuerwehrmann 
Hermann Picha as Ein Musiker 
Hans Wassmann as Petrus 
Andreas van Horn as Johann Strauß
Olga Engl as Gräfin Zirsky 
Arnold Korff as Carl Conzaga 
Georg Burghardt as Conzaga's secretary 
Gyula Szőreghy

References

External links

German historical comedy films
1920s historical comedy films
Films of the Weimar Republic
German silent feature films
Films directed by Frederic Zelnik
Films set in Vienna
Films set in the 1890s
German black-and-white films
1920s German films
Films shot in Vienna
Films shot at Staaken Studios
1927 films
1920s German-language films
1927 comedy films